Walter J. Enright, also known as Pat Enright, (1879 - January 19, 1969) was an American cartoonist.

Life
Enright was born in Chicago in 1879. He attended the Chicago Art Institute and Armour Institute of Technology, and he served as a pilot in Europe during World War I.

Enright became a professional cartoonist New York City, where his work was published in the New York American and the New York World. He was also an illustrator for The Century Magazine, Redbook, Collier's, Scribner, McClure's, and Life. He later moved to Florida, where he was a cartoonist for the Miami Herald from 1933 to 1943, and for The Palm Beach Post from 1943 to 1948.

Enright had a daughter, Elizabeth Enright, with his first wife, illustrator Maginel Wright Enright. Elizabeth Enright became an author. He and Maginel were married in 1904, divorcing before 1920. His second wife was named Rae.

He resided in Delray Beach, Florida, where he died on January 19, 1969, at the age of 93.

References

1879 births
1969 deaths
Artists from Chicago
People from Delray Beach, Florida
Military personnel from Illinois
School of the Art Institute of Chicago alumni
Illinois Institute of Technology alumni
American World War I pilots
American cartoonists